State Route 34 is a decommissioned state highway in Nevada from prior to the state's highway restructuring in 1978. Today a portion of former SR 34 is maintained by the Washoe County as a county highway with the not well known designation CR 34. A portion of State Route 447 was formerly SR 34, though the former SR 34 road bed is still used from Gerlach, Nevada to near Vya, Nevada.

History
In the 1950s the pavement ended and became gravel just past the sand dunes north of Nixon.  In 1953, south of Gerlach, the paving was incomplete and State Route 81 from Gerlach to the California state line was not surfaced.
By 1963, the road was paved to Gerlach and State Route 81 was partly paved from Gerlach to the California State Line.

Before 1978 SR 34 followed present day SR 447 route, from Gerlach to Wadsworth, Nevada.

Major intersections

References

034